The Division of Jagajaga is an Australian Electoral Division in the state of Victoria. It is located in the north-eastern suburbs of Melbourne, and lies north of the Yarra River. It covers an area of approximately 104 square kilometres and comprises the suburbs of Bellfield, Briar Hill, Diamond Creek, Eaglemont, Greensborough, Heidelberg, Heidelberg Heights, Heidelberg West, Ivanhoe, Ivanhoe East, Lower Plenty, Montmorency, Plenty, Rosanna, St Helena, Viewbank, Yallambie, Watsonia and Watsonia North; and parts of Bundoora, Eltham, Eltham North, Hurstbridge, Macleod, Wattle Glen and Yarrambat.

The area is predominantly residential and light industrial, and includes the Australian Army's Simpson Barracks, the Heidelberg Repatriation Hospital, the Mercy Hospital for Women and the Austin Hospital.

Most of the City of Banyule and parts of the Shire of Nillumbik local government areas are contained within the Division's boundaries. Four Victorian Parliamentary Districts (Legislative Assembly) are represented in the Division, namely Ivanhoe, Eltham, Bundoora and Yan Yean. The Legislative Council Regions of Northern Metropolitan and Eastern Metropolitan are also represented.

Geography
Since 1984, federal electoral division boundaries in Australia have been determined at redistributions by a redistribution committee appointed by the Australian Electoral Commission. Redistributions occur for the boundaries of divisions in a particular state, and they occur every seven years, or sooner if a state's representation entitlement changes or when divisions of a state are malapportioned.

History

The Division was proclaimed at the redistribution of 14 September 1984, and was first contested at the 1984 election. The division replaced the western half of the abolished Division of Diamond Valley, with the eastern half becoming the Division of Menzies. It was named after three Wurundjeri Aboriginal Australian men who supposedly made the Batman Treaty with the party of early colonial settler and one of the founders of Melbourne, John Batman in 1835.

The Division has always been a marginal-to-safe Labor seat. It was first held by Peter Staples, who served as a minister under Bob Hawke and Paul Keating. Staples retired in 1996 and was replaced by Jenny Macklin, who has held the seat prior to her retirement in 2018. Macklin served as Deputy Leader of the Australian Labor Party under Simon Crean, Mark Latham and Kim Beazley, as well as a minister under Kevin Rudd and Julia Gillard. In 2018, Macklin announced her retirement from politics. Kate Thwaites replaced Macklin as Labor's candidate for the area and subsequently won the seat in the 2019 Australian federal election.

Members

Election results

References

External links
 Division of Jagajaga – Australian Electoral Commission

Electoral divisions of Australia
Constituencies established in 1984
1984 establishments in Australia
City of Banyule
Shire of Nillumbik
Electoral districts and divisions of Greater Melbourne